La Dama de Troya is a Colombian telenovela (soap opera) that has aired since April 15, 2008 on Colombian network RCN. This telenovela is produced by Fox Telecolombia. It was launched to reinforce the prime time schedule on RCN on the same narrative tone of previous RCN successful telenovela Pura Sangre (Pure Blood), involving drama and revenge. With Pura Sangre (Pure Blood), La Dama de Troya gets back to intense drama and revenge storylines, which were missing on Colombian television after the success of popular comedy telenovelas as Betty la fea.

La Dama de Troya since its premiere is aired after RCN News 7:00 p.m. and it is the opening telenovela on RCN's prime time. The novela premieres in the United States on TeleFutura at 10:00 p.m. on Monday, June 2, 2008.

Story
Patricia Cruz (Cristina Umaña) and her husband Humberto Muñoz (Luis Fernando Salas), a young farmer man, several years ago refused to sell their lands to Puerto Dorado's landlord Antonio de la Torre (Rolando Tarajano) for his new project: a modern meat processing center.

Learning that Patricia and Humberto are not selling their lands on good terms, Antonio decides to invade their lands on their very wedding night, threatening them into signing the sale papers. When Humberto refuses to sign anyway, Antonio kills him without any remorse. then, Antonio wearing a hood and having Patricia under his control, proceeds to rape her and then to shoot her. Thinking she is dead, Antonio gets rid of the bodies by dumping them in a river.

Miraculously, Patricia is not dead and is rescued by a man called Pierre who heals her and protects her with the help from his friend, Jacinta (Adriana Ricardo).

Once Patricia recovers, she decides to investigate who killed her husband and who raped her (she just remembers a horse chess piece hanging from the gold chain around the rapist's neck), but she cannot find out anything except that her lands now belong to somebody else.

Having no place to go, Jacinta takes Patricia to live with her and she starts to learn the hard skills of leading cattle and handling horses, which is very common on the Eastern Plains of Colombia.

The same day that Patricia decides to come back to her public life in Puerto Dorado she meets Sebastian (Andrés Juan Hernandez) who is just arriving to town after several years studying in Bogotá. Patricia has an argument with Sebastian showing that she is not the stupid and innocent woman she used to be. Astonished by Patricia's disposition and temper, he immediately is deeply attracted to her despite that he is engaged to a frivolous and superficial woman, Nena (Valentina Acosta).

Although she does not recognize it, Patricia is strongly attracted to Sebastian ignoring he's the son of the man who raped her and killed her husband several years ago.

Reception
La Dama de Troya (The Woman from Troya) was very successful in many countries of America and Europe.

References

2008 telenovelas
2008 Colombian television series debuts
2009 Colombian television series endings
Colombian telenovelas
RCN Televisión telenovelas
Spanish-language telenovelas
Television shows set in Colombia